Radhanagar is a village in the Bishnupur CD block in the Bishnupur subdivision of the Bankura district in the state of West Bengal, India

Geography

Location

Area overview
The map alongside shows the Bishnupur subdivision of Bankura district. Physiographically, this area has fertile low lying alluvial plains. It is a predominantly rural area with 90.06% of the population living in rural areas and only 8.94% living in the urban areas. It was a part of the core area of Mallabhum.

Note: The map alongside presents some of the notable locations in the subdivision. All places marked in the map are linked in the larger full screen map.

Demographics
According to the 2011 Census of India, Radhanagar had a total population of 5,335 of which 2,662 (50%) were males and 2,673 (50%) were females. Population below 6 years was 500. The total number of literates in Radhanagar was 3,428 (70.90% of the population over 6 years).

Transport
The Bishnupur-Sonamukhi Road passes through Radhanagar.

Education
Radhanagar High School is a Bengali-medium coeducational institution established in 1938. It has facilities for teaching from class V to class XII. The school has 20 computers, a library with 3,000 books and a playground.

Swami Dhananjoy Das Kathiababa Mahavidyalaya was established at Bhara in 2009.

Healthcare
Radhanagar Rural Hospital, with 30 beds at Radhanagar, is the major government medical facility in the Bishnupur CD block. There are primary health centres at Ajodhya (with 6 beds), Kankila (with 6 beds) and Bhora (with 10 beds).

References

Villages in Bankura district